Jill Carnegy, Countess of Northesk (née Gomez; born 21 September 1942) is a Trinidadian and British soprano who enjoyed an active career on the operatic stage and in the concert hall in a wide repertoire, and has made many recordings.

Life and career 
Gomez was born in New Amsterdam, Guyana, to Albert Clyde Gomez, a Spanish Trinidadian and to Denise Price Gomez (née Denham), and brought up in Port of Spain, Trinidad and Tobago. Her father became managing director and vice-chairman of Angostura, the famous distillers, and her British mother was a well-known actress and broadcaster in Trinidad.

After studying at St. Joseph's Convent (Port of Spain) in Trinidad and dominating at the islands' biennial Music Festival, she moved to England at 13, where she studied voice and piano at London's Royal Academy of Music and Guildhall School of Music and Drama, where her most important teacher was Walther Gruner. While studying at Guildhall, Jill performed the role of Helen on alternate nights with contralto singer Ann Wilson, in The Conspirators (Shubert), directed by Brian Trowell.  

Her career began at Glyndebourne where she twice won the John Christie Award, making her solo operatic debut as Adina in Donizetti's L'elisir d'amore with the Glyndebourne Touring Opera in 1968. Also in 1968 came her Aminta in Il re pastore, at Ledlanet Nights. Gomez then created the role of Flora in The Knot Garden at the Royal Opera, London in 1970 and that of the Countess in Thea Musgrave's The Voice of Ariadne at the Aldeburgh Festival in 1973. She also appeared in productions by the English National Opera (Governess),  Scottish Opera (Elisabeth, Pamina, Anne Truelove, Leïla), Oper Frankfurt (Cleopatra), Kent Opera (Tatyana, Violetta, Aminta, Donna Anna), Glyndebourne (Mélisande, La Calisto), Grand Théâtre de Bordeaux (Fiordiligi), Wexford (Thaïs and Rosaura) and Teresa at the Berlioz Festival in Lyon.

She worked closely with Jonathan Miller in La traviata for Kent Opera (Edinburgh Festival and UK tour), and Eugene Onegin and The Turn of the Screw (with ENO). She also played the Governess with the English Opera Group with the composer, Benjamin Britten, present.

Gomez was outspoken about the "international opera circus" and had no ambition to sing at the largest houses, preferring smaller venues such as Zürich where there is sufficient rehearsal time. She appeared in Jean-Pierre Ponnelle's production of Lucio Silla there, conducted by Nikolaus Harnoncourt. She also sang Arne cantatas with Jaap Schröder and Concerto Amsterdam. She took part in Mahler's Symphony No. 2 with the Israel Philharmonic under Solti. As well as recording of Ravel, with Boulez she performed the Webern Opp. 13 and 14 song cycles.

In 1995 Gomez created the lead role of the Duchess of Argyll in Powder Her Face. Her recording of the latter role was nominated for a Grammy Award, and in Allmusic Erik Eriksson wrote: "Gomez's portrayal is a tour de force, alternately opulent and unhinged. She achieves the difficult task of making a figure of ridicule into a person who evokes sympathy from the listener." Alongside The Knot Garden and The Voice of Ariadne, she was also in the premieres of Miss Julie (William Alwyn, 1979) and Maddalena (Prokofiev, radio, 1980).

Her TV debut was in the series Music Now produced by John Drummond in 1968–69, and other TV and film credits include the French film Une Femme française, and television programmes A Ladies Knight! (1987), Rattle on Britten (1985) and a BBC programme Opera in Rehearsal: The Marriage of Figaro Act 2 with Anthony Besch (1973).

Gomez lives in Cambridgeshire with her husband, music critic Patrick Carnegy, 15th Earl of Northesk.

Selected discography
 Thomas Adès – Powder Her Face, Almeida Ensemble Thomas Adès EMI Classics 7243 5 56649 2 
 William Alwyn – Song-cycle: Invocations (John Constable, piano) CHAN 9220
 William Alwyn – Miss Julie (title rôle), Philharmonia Orchestra, Vilém Tauský Lyrita SRCD2218 
 Britten – A Midsummer Night's Dream (Helena), City of London Sinfonia, Richard Hickox
 Britten – Les Illuminations, Op. 18, Endymion Ensemble, John Whitfield EMI Classics 95579 
 Canteloube – Songs of the Auvergne with the Royal Liverpool Philharmonic Orchestra, conducted by Vernon Handley – awarded a Rosette in the Penguin Guide to CDs and DVDs (17 songs) EMI Eminence – CD-EMX 9500
 Donizetti – Il giovedì grasso, Radio Teflis Eireann Symphony Orchestra (David Atherton) Foyer Cat: 1-CF 2036: Memories Cat: HR 4482
 Manuel de Falla  – The Three-Cornered Hat (complete), Philharmonia Orchestra, Yan Pascal Tortelier CHAN8904
 Fauré – Pelléas et Mélisande, Suite Op. 80: "The king's three blind daughters", Rotterdam Philharmonic Orchestra, David Zinman Philips 464701  
 Handel – Admeto (Antigone), Milan Baroque Ensemble, Alan Curtis 
 Handel – Acis and Galatea (Galatea), Academy of St-Martin-in-the-Fields, Neville Marriner Argo ZRG 886–887
 Alun Hoddinott – Sinfonia Fidei, Op. 95 with Stuart Burrows, Philharmonia Orchestra and Chorus, Charles Groves Lyrita 332 
 David Matthews – Cantiga, Op. 45, Bournemouth Sinfonietta, John Carewe  – NMC 84
 John McCabe – Notturni ed alba, City of Birmingham Symphony Orchestra, Louis Frémaux EMI Studio 63176
 Monteverdi – Vespro della Beata Vergine 1610, Monteverdi Choir, Philip Jones Brass Ensemble, Monteverdi Orchestra, John Eliot Gardiner Decca 443482
 Mozart – Don Giovanni (in German: Elvira), Orchester Ludwigsburger Festspiele (Wolfgang Gönnenwein)
 Mozart – Songs – (sixteen songs) (John Constable, piano) SAGA 5441 LP
 Pergolesi – Stabat Mater, Eufoda 1036 / 6803 143 LP
 Poulenc – Dialogues des Carmélites, VB/Hilversum/Radio Philharmonic Orchestra (Henry Lewis) KRO-Radio/Antwoordnummer 234, 1200
 Ravel – Trois poèmes de Mallarmé, BBC Symphony Orchestra, Pierre Boulez CBS M39023
 Tippett – The Knot Garden, Orchestra of the Royal Opera House (Colin Davis) Philips 6700 063
 Villa-Lobos – Bachianas Brasileiras No 5 ; Suite for Voice and Violin, Pleeth Cello Octet, Peter Manning Hyperion 66257
 Wagner – Die Feen (extracts), Orchester des Internationalen Jugend-Festspieltreffens 	Bayreuth (John Bell) Colosseum Colos SM 4002 
 Walton – Troilus and Cressida, Act II, London Symphony Orchestra (André Previn) CD recording from the BBC Proms: Sir William Walton's 70th Anniversary Concert: JG private collection
 Walton – Songs after Edith Sitwell; A Song for the Lord Mayor's Table, City of London Sinfonia, Richard Hickox CHAN8824
 Songs by Bizet, Berlioz, Debussy (John Constable, piano) LP SAGA 5388
 A Spanish Songbook (piano, John Constable) Villancicos Hugo Wolf Robert Schumann, Bizet, Ravel, Saint-Saens, Enrique Granados, Walton/Sitwell, Gerhard, Tarrago, Rodrigo, Guiridi, Obradors, 1994, Conifer Classics CDCF 243
 South of the Border ...down Mexico way (with The Markham and Nettle Piano Duo, National Philharmonic Orchestra, Barry Wordsworth). The Lady in Red by Allie Wrubel; Begin the Beguine Cole Porter; Peanut Vendor Moisés Simons; Perfida Alberto Domínguez; The Carioca Vincent Youmans; Amor, Amor, Amor Gabriel Ruiz; Orchids in the moonlight Youmans; Cielito Lindo Pablo Santos; Nina from Argentina Noël Coward; Poinciana Nat Simon; La Cucaracha traditional; La Paloma Sebastián de Iradier; Flying down to Rio Youmans.

References

Warrack, John and West, Ewan (1992), The Oxford Dictionary of Opera, 782 pages, 

20th-century British women opera singers
1942 births
Living people
20th-century Trinidad and Tobago women singers
20th-century Trinidad and Tobago singers
People from Port of Spain
Trinidad and Tobago emigrants to the United Kingdom
Alumni of the Royal Academy of Music
Alumni of the Guildhall School of Music and Drama
Northesk
Trinidad and Tobago opera singers